Calgary Avansino (born 6 May 1975) is a contributing editor to the British edition of Vogue and Wellbeing expert. After moving to London in 2000, she began a three-week internship at Vogue. Soon after, she was offered the job as assistant to the editor-in-chief, Alexandra Shulman. Two and a half years later, she shifted to the beauty department where she became a beauty assistant, followed by Wellbeing editor, then executive fashion director. Between 2008 and 2013, she was executive fashion and digital project director.

Avansino left her full-time role at Vogue in 2013, to become a contributing editor. She wrote a weekly Wellbeing blog for Vogue, ran her own health and Wellbeing website, and is the author of Keep It Real.

As of October 2017, Avansino is now the CEO of GLAMCAM.

Early life 
Avansino was born in 1975. Brought up on the West Coast of America as a vegetarian, Avansino was taught a great deal about the fundamentals of healthy living by her parents. She went to Cate School and graduated from Georgetown University in 1998. Avansino moved to England in 2000 with her husband. In 2017, Avansino and her family returned to California, United States.

Career 

Avansino started her fashion journalism career in 2000 as an intern at British Vogue.  She became assistant to editor-in-chief Alexandra Shulman, and from there held a number of positions, working in the beauty department as a beauty assistant, followed by Wellbeing editor, and then moving to the main fashion team and working as executive fashion director. Avansino worked as executive fashion and digital project director between 2008 and 2013. In early 2013, she left her full-time position to become contributing editor. Avansino contributes to the publication regularly and has a weekly Wellbeing blog on the Vogue website. She has also contributed to The Sunday Times Style magazine, along with numerous other publications globally, and has her own website. Avansino is regularly interviewed in print, online, at events and on television for her thoughts on Wellbeing, exercise, and healthy eating. In February 2016, her debut book Keep It Real: ''Create a Healthy, Balanced and Delicious Life - For You and Your Family' was released.'''
Calgary is now the CEO of the beauty startup GLAMCAM, an app revolutionizing social beauty shopping.

Personal life 

Avansino is married and has three children.

References 

Living people
1975 births
British Vogue
British fashion journalists
The Sunday Times people
British women journalists
Writers from London
Journalists from California
Place of birth missing (living people)